The canton of Doué-en-Anjou (before March 2020: canton of Doué-la-Fontaine) is an administrative division of the Maine-et-Loire department, in western France. It was created at the French canton reorganisation which came into effect in March 2015. Its seat is in Doué-en-Anjou.

It consists of the following communes:

Antoigné 
Bellevigne-les-Châteaux
Brissac Loire Aubance (partly)
Brossay
Cizay-la-Madeleine
Le Coudray-Macouard
Courchamps
Dénezé-sous-Doué
Doué-en-Anjou
Épieds
Gennes-Val-de-Loire (partly)
Louresse-Rochemenier
Montreuil-Bellay
Le Puy-Notre-Dame
Saint-Just-sur-Dive
Saint-Macaire-du-Bois
Tuffalun
Les Ulmes
Vaudelnay

References

Cantons of Maine-et-Loire